James David Barber (July 31, 1930 – September 12, 2004) was a political scientist whose book The Presidential Character made him famous for his classification of presidents through their worldviews. From 1977 to 1995, he taught political science at Duke University.

Background
Barber was born on July 31, 1930, in Charleston, West Virginia, to a physician and a nurse. In the 1950s he served in the United States Army as a counter-intelligence agent before attending the University of Chicago, where he earned a master's degree in political science. He earned a Ph.D. in the same field from Yale University.

He joined the faculty at Duke University in 1972, and became a full professor there in 1977.  Before going to Duke he had taught at Stetson University in DeLand, Florida.  

He is credited in the field of political science for being the first to examine presidents beyond case studies. He devised a system of organizing a president's character  into either active-positive, passive-positive, active-negative, or passive-negative.
 Traits of an active-positive president include: a readiness to act, high optimism, and an overall fondness of the presidency. Some examples of presidents Barber cites as active-positive include Franklin D. Roosevelt, Harry S. Truman, John F. Kennedy, Jimmy Carter, and Gerald Ford.
 Traits of a passive-positive president include: a low self-esteem compensated by an ingratiating personality, superficially optimistic, and a desire to please. Examples of passive-positive presidents include William Howard Taft, Ronald Reagan, and Warren G. Harding.
 Traits of an active-negative president include: lack of deriving joy after expending much effort on tasks, aggressive, highly rigid, and having a general view of power as a means to self-realization. Examples of active-negative presidents include Woodrow Wilson, Herbert Hoover, and Richard Nixon.
 Traits of a passive-negative president include: a strong sense of duty, desire to avoid power, low self-esteem compensated by service towards others, and an overall aversion to intense political negotiation. Presidential examples include Calvin Coolidge and Dwight D. Eisenhower.

References

External links
 

1930 births
2004 deaths
American political philosophers
University of Chicago alumni
Yale Graduate School of Arts and Sciences alumni
Duke University faculty
American political writers
American male non-fiction writers
Richard Nixon
Writers from Charleston, West Virginia
Educators from Charleston, West Virginia
National Association of Scholars
Military personnel from Charleston, West Virginia